Massimiliano Iezzi (born 1 February 1981 in Italy) is an Italian footballer who plays for ASD Aranova in his home country.

Career

Iezzi started his senior career with A.S. Roma. In 2005, he signed for Polonia Warsaw in the Polish Ekstraklasa, where he made seven appearances and scored zero goals. After that, he played for Italian clubs Nuorese Calcio, Paganese Calcio 1926, U.S.D. Castelsardo, Terracina Calcio 1925, S.S.D. Fidelis Andria 2018, Colleferro Calcio 1937, A.S.D. Civitavecchia 1920, A.S.D. Anziolavinio, ASD Real Monterotondo Scalo and ASD Aranoova, where he now plays.

References 

Italian footballers
1981 births
Living people
Polonia Warsaw players
Association football forwards
Association football midfielders